Chi Centauri (χ Cen, χ Centauri) is a star in the constellation Centaurus.

χ Centauri is a blue-white B-type main sequence dwarf with a mean apparent magnitude of +4.36.  It is approximately 510 light years from Earth.  It is classified as a Beta Cephei type variable star and its brightness varies by 0.02 magnitudes with a period of 50.40 minutes.

This star is a proper motion member of the Upper Centaurus–Lupus sub-group in the
Scorpius–Centaurus OB association,
the nearest such co-moving association of massive stars to the Sun.

References

Centauri, Chi
Beta Cephei variables
B-type main-sequence stars
Centaurus (constellation)
Upper Centaurus Lupus
5285
068862
122980
CD-40 8405